Mirina christophi is a moth of the family Endromidae. It is found in the Amur region and the Korean Peninsula.

The wingspan is 40–45 mm.

External links
Fauna Europaea
Colour Atlas of Siberian Lepidoptera
Species info

Moths described in 1887
Endromidae